Clayton Wayne Sasser (born February 1, 1950) is an American politician who is a Republican member of the North Carolina House of Representatives representing the 67th district (including all of Stanly County and parts of Cabarrus County), having been initially elected in 2018. He defeated incumbent representative Justin Burr in the Republican primary, and was later elected to the seat.

Committee assignments

2021-2022 Session
Appropriations (Vice Chair)
Appropriations - Health and Human Services (Chair)
Health (Chair)
Insurance (Vice Chair)
Local Government 
Agriculture 
Families, Children, and Aging Policy

2019-2020 Session
Health 
Insurance 
State and Local Government 
Finance 
Wildlife Resources

Electoral history

2020

2018

References

Living people
1950 births
People from Stanly County, North Carolina
People from Albemarle, North Carolina
University of North Carolina at Chapel Hill alumni
21st-century American politicians
Democratic Party members of the North Carolina House of Representatives